Christ and the Virgin Mary Interceding for Humanity is a c.1490 oil and tempera on panel painting by Gherardo di Giovanni del Fora, a painter from the entourage of Domenico Ghirlandaio. It is now in the Montreal Museum of Fine Arts, which bought it using a legacy from the John W Tempest foundation. In the foreground is a saint, probably Bernard of Clairvaux (the Virgin's breast recalls The Lactation of St Bernard).

References

Paintings in the collection of the Montreal Museum of Fine Arts
1490 paintings
Paintings of the Virgin Mary
Paintings depicting Jesus
Paintings of saints